The Fire Inside is the fourteenth studio album by American singer-songwriter Bob Seger. The album was released in mid 1991 on the record label, Capitol. It was Seger's first album of entirely new music since Like a Rock in 1986. Though credited to "The Silver Bullet Band", much of the album used guest and session musicians, with limited contributions from Silver Bullet Band members.  Among the guest artists on the album are Joe Walsh, Bruce Hornsby, Roy Bittan, Steve Lukather, Don Was, Waddy Wachtel, Rick Vito, Mike Campbell, Patty Smyth, Lisa Germano, and Kenny Aronoff.

On release, The Fire Inside received a mixed critical reception, but was still a commercial success peaking at number 7 on the US Billboard album chart, and achieved Platinum status from the RIAA.

Critical reception
Reviewing for AllMusic, critic Bret Adams wrote of the album "Overall, the 12-track album is a disappointing piecemeal effort with five different production credits, and Seger uses two Tom Waits covers and one other outside song to pad it."

Track listing

Personnel
As listed in the liner notes.

Musicians

 Bob Seger – electric guitar (1, 4, 8, 9), acoustic guitar (3), rhythm guitar (1, 8), piano (10), electric piano (2), vocals (all tracks), choir (3), chorus (3), harmony vocals (2, 4)
 Kenny Aronoff – drums (1–3, 8, 9)
 Sweet Pea Atkinson – background vocals (2)
 Eddie Bayers – drums (4, 5)
 Barry Beckett – bridge synthesizer (5)
 Roy Bittan – piano (6)
 Sir Harry Bowens – background vocals (2)
 Bobby Bruce – violin (11)
 Rosemary Butler – background vocals (11)
 Chris Campbell – bass (10, 12)
 Mike Campbell – lead guitar (2)
 Mimi Cooper – background vocals (4)
 Laura Creamer – background vocals (11)
 Thornetta Davis – background vocals (4)
 Craig Frost – organ (1, 2, 4, 8, 12), synthesizer (5, 10), piano (1, 9)
 Lisa Germano – violin (1, 3)
 Donny Gerrard – background vocals (2, 3, 11), choir (3), chorus (3)
 Bob Glaub – bass (6)
 Richard Greene – violin (11)
 Richie Hayward – drums (7, 11)
 Bruce Hornsby – piano (5), accordion (3)
 James Newton Howard – Synclavier (2)
 Dann Huff – electric guitar (4, 5, 12), rhythm guitar (12)
 James "Hutch" Hutchinson – bass (2, 8, 9)
 John Jorgenson – slide guitar (8)
 Russ Kunkel – drums (6)
 Steve Lukather – acoustic guitar (6), electric guitar (10)
 Donald Ray Mitchell – background vocals (2)
 Jamie Muhoberac – synthesizer (1, 2, 9)
 Shaun Murphy – background vocals (4, 11), harmony vocals (4)
 Buell Neidlinger – acoustic bass (7, 11)
 Dean Parks – acoustic guitar (11), electric guitar (7)
 Bill Payne – piano (7, 11)
 Don Potter – acoustic guitar (5)
 Alto Reed – saxophone (3, 10, 12)
 Michael Rhodes – bass (4, 5)
 Walt Richmond – piano (12)
 Patty Smyth – background vocals (2, 3), choir (3), chorus (3), harmony vocals (9)
 J. D. Souther – background vocals (2, 3), choir (3), chorus (3)
 Fred Tackett – acoustic guitar (7, 11)
 David Teegarden – drums (10, 12)
 Rick Vito – lead guitar (1, 12), slide guitar (10, 12)
 Waddy Wachtel – acoustic guitar (3), rhythm guitar (1, 2, 8, 9)
 Don Was – bass (1, 3)
 Joe Walsh – lead guitar (9)
 Oren Waters – harmony vocals (2, 3)
 Jai Winding – organ (6)

Production
Producers: Punch Andrews, Barry Beckett, Bob Seger, Don Was
Engineers: Allen Abrahamson, Bryant Arnett, Craig Brock, Ed Cherney, Denis Forbes, Ed Goodreau, John Kunz, Michael Mason, Justin Niebank, Thom Panunzio, Gerard Smerek, Randy Wine
Assistant engineers: Greg Fogie, Tom Banghart, Dan Bosworth, Buzz Burrowes, Jim DeMain, John Hurley, Marnie Riley, Don Smith, Brett Swain, Don Was
Mixing: Punch Andrews, Ed Cherney, David N. Cole, Bob Seger
Photography: John Abeyla

Charts

Album

Singles

Certifications

References

Bob Seger albums
1991 albums
Albums produced by Don Was
Albums produced by Barry Beckett
Albums produced by Punch Andrews
Capitol Records albums